The 2008 Australian Open was a tennis tournament played on outdoor hard courts. It was the 96th edition of the Australian Open, and the first Grand Slam event of the year. It took place at the Melbourne Park in Melbourne, Australia, from 14 through 27 January 2008.

After twenty years of playing on Rebound Ace, the courts were changed to Plexicushion, a marginally faster surface. The new surface is thinner, and therefore has lower heat retention. This decision was made in a bid to reduce the "stick" of the court and the frequency of the extreme heat policy being invoked. However, the new surface faced criticism for being too similar to DecoTurf, the surface used at the US Open. Player reaction to the change of surface was generally ambivalent.

Both Roger Federer and Serena Williams were unsuccessful in defending their 2007 titles; Federer losing to Novak Djokovic in the semi-finals and Williams losing in the quarter-finals to Jelena Janković. Djokovic won his first Grand Slam singles title, defeating unseeded Jo-Wilfried Tsonga in the final; Maria Sharapova, runner-up to Williams in 2007, defeated Ana Ivanovic to win her first Australian Open title and third Grand Slam title.

For the mixed doubles, in every game, the first team to score four points, won the game. In other words, when a deuce happened in a game, the team who won the next point won the game.

Notable stories

Surface change
On 30 May 2007, Australian Open tournament director Craig Tiley announced that as of the 2008 Australian Open, the Rebound Ace surface that had been used since 1988 would be replaced by a newer, faster Plexicushion surface. The Rebound Ace surface had been criticized for several years, from players including Andy Roddick and Mark Philippoussis, who claimed that the "stick" of the court was a contributing factor in many players injuring themselves. This "stick" was a result of the thick rubber mat (10 mm) laid beneath the surface, the high heat retention because of this, and the high temperatures present during the Australian summer, which intermittently resulted in the extreme heat policy being invoked. Conversely, players such as Pete Sampras and Marat Safin put the high number of injuries down to lack of preparation from players; partly due to the fact that the tournament is held so early in the year, but also because there were so few tournaments preceding it. Rebound Ace was also chastised by Lleyton Hewitt for having an inconsistent bounce, in terms of height and pace (shock absorption); and claimed that these factors varied depending on the weather. The heat retention of the surface had also been a point of contention between players.

In announcing the change, Tiley said Plexicushion would have a "lower rubber content than Rebound Ace, was firmer under foot and retained less heat through its thinner top layer." Tiley later said that the change of colour, from green to blue, would also benefit players and officials, although this change was quite arbitrary. The manufacturers of Rebound Ace derided the new surface, with director Paul Bull saying that, "We had an Australian icon event with a unique Australian product and now we are just going to become a clone of the US Open." Bull also said that the inconsistencies in pace were down to the organizers' imperative, who kept asking for the pace to be adjusted to pander for certain players, such as Hewitt. Bull, however, conceded that a change was needed; and said that the suggestion of a Rebound Ace court with a rubber mat thickness of around 5 mm was made.

The Plexicushion surface received a relatively mixed reception from players. Lleyton Hewitt, Justine Henin and Serena Williams were all keen to endorse the new courts; with Hewitt's appraisal focused on the greater consistency of the courts. Henin called it a "good surface" but said she did not find it markedly distinguishable from Rebound Ace, saying the biggest difference was the change of colour. Williams claimed that the court was not as "bouncy" and was causing less physical strain on her feet and ankles. One source of criticism from players was the slower than expected pace, although many of these comments came prior to the event's commencement. Players were exposed to the new courts through other tournaments, played in advance of the Open; and practise on the new surface. Roger Federer described it as slow, with Novak Djokovic, Jelena Janković and James Blake all corroborating this opinion, albeit from experience in preliminary tournaments. Pundit and former World No. 1 Pat Rafter said it was possible that the courts would speed up in time.

Implementation of anti-corruption policing
On 21 December 2007, organizers of the event announced that the tournament would be watched under the scrutiny of anti-corruption officials. A partnership was formed with Victoria Police. This announcement came in the wake of a series of scandals to hit the sport, including World No. 4 Nikolay Davydenko coming under suspicion of match fixing; with at least a dozen other players coming forward about having been approached to influence matches in an unethical manner. Tennis Australia chief executive Steve Wood commented that, "Match-fixing and illegal gambling are a threat to the integrity of sport. We're putting our policies, procedures and programme in place to protect it."

This was followed by a statement from the wider community of the International Tennis Federation (ITF), Association of Tennis Professionals (ATP), Women's Tennis Association (WTA) and organizers of all four Grand Slams that they would review their anti-corruption policies in the future. This announcement came six days prior to the start of the Open, on 8 January 2008.

Crowd trouble
On 15 January, Day 2 of the tournament, Victoria Police had to intervene when Greek Australian supporters, following Greece's Konstantinos Economidis in his match against Chilean Fernando González, became unruly. The match, in progress at the Margaret Court Arena, was suspended for ten minutes as the police attempted stop the "offensive chanting" and eject certain fans. Approximately forty supporters, heavily outnumbered by Chilean fans, were warned of their disorderly conduct prior to the police deploying pepper spray. The police regiment was heavily outnumbered, with a BBC Radio employee commenting that, "[there were] two guys against maybe 70-80, that's not good." Tournament officials said that 3 people had been sprayed and 5 evicted; a small proportion of the Greek fans left the arena, upset at how events were transpiring and fearing for their safety.

Both players said that the trouble was not something they had witnessed before; and Economidis condemned his supporters, saying that, "It was a really nice atmosphere until this moment. I am really unhappy." Some witnesses have implicated Cypriot and Serbian supporters in the trouble.

Australian Open director, Craig Tiley, had announced in the week preceding the event that police and security forces would "impose a 'zero-tolerance' policy on anti-social behaviour". This statement appeared to be a delayed reaction to the trouble that marred the event in 2007, with Australian youths of Greek, Serbian and Croatian origins involved in mutually abusive sparring. However, the problem was much more pronounced in 2007, with violence breaking out and around 150 fans ejected.

Sexual assault
Police were called to investigate a report that a 12-year-old girl was indecently assaulted by a drunk man at the Australian Open.

In a brief statement, Victoria Police said they received a report that the girl was inappropriately touched on the buttocks on Monday.

"The matter was reported to police this morning and the incident is currently being investigated", the statement said. This event mirrors a series of incidents that occurred at last year's event, when several men attending the tournament were arrested for taking upskirt photographs.

Marcos Baghdatis video controversy
During the Open, a video posted on YouTube almost a year earlier made headlines in the Australian media. The video shows the 2008 fifteenth seed, Cypriot Marcos Baghdatis, at a barbecue hosted by his Greek Australian fans in Melbourne in early 2007. In it, Baghdatis is holding a flare and taking part in chants against the Turkish invasion of Cyprus. Melbourne's Turkish Cypriot community called for Baghdatis to be expelled from Australia, but in a statement issued through his manager, the Cypriot player said he was "supporting the interest of my country, Cyprus, while protesting against a situation that is not recognized by the United Nations".

Serbian performance

This tournament saw strong performances from Serbian players. The men's side saw Janko Tipsarević, winner of the boys' tournament in 2001, almost cause an upset when he pushed Roger Federer to five sets in the third round, with the final score being 6–7 (5–7), 7–6 (7–1), 5–7, 6–1, 10–8 in Federer's favour. The match, which overlapped into the night session due to rain earlier in the day, took almost four-and-a-half hours to complete. Third-seed Novak Djokovic became Serbia's first Grand Slam singles title winner (Ana Ivanovic would later become that country's first Grand Slam women's singles title winner, at the 2008 French Open), and the youngest ever winner of the Australian Open, at 20 years and 250 days of age, when he defeated surprise finalist Jo-Wilfried Tsonga in the final, having defeated the defending champion Federer in the semi-finals, and Australian hopeful Lleyton Hewitt in straight sets in the fourth round. Coincidentally, Djokovic would also defeat Federer in straight sets en route to his second Australian Open title, in 2011.

The women's draw saw Jelena Janković, the 2001 girls' champion, and Ana Ivanovic produce notable performances to reach the semi-finals and the final, respectively. Janković saved three match points against Tamira Paszek in the first round, before defeating rising Australian player Casey Dellacqua in the fourth round. Janković then ended the title defence of Serena Williams in the quarter-finals, before losing her semi-final to Maria Sharapova. Twenty-four hours after Janković's victory over Serena Williams, Ana Ivanovic recorded her first career victory against Venus Williams in her quarter-final, and went on to reach her second Grand Slam final by defeating Daniela Hantuchová in the semi-finals, having to recover from a 0–6, 0–2 deficit to do so. Ivanovic was then defeated in the final by Maria Sharapova, in a match dubbed as the "Glam Slam" final.

Day-by-day summaries

Seniors

Men's singles

 Novak Djokovic defeated  Jo-Wilfried Tsonga, 4–6, 6–4, 6–3, 7–6(7–2)
 It was Djokovic's 1st title of the year, and his 8th overall. It was his 1st career Grand Slam title.

Women's singles

 Maria Sharapova defeated  Ana Ivanovic, 7–5, 6–3

Men's doubles

 Jonathan Erlich /  Andy Ram defeated  Arnaud Clément /  Michaël Llodra, 7–5, 7–6(7–4)
 The duo's first Grand Slam win after numerous ATP titles
 The first ever Grand Slam trophy in Men's Doubles for Israeli players.

Women's doubles

 Alona Bondarenko /  Kateryna Bondarenko defeated   Victoria Azarenka /  Shahar Pe'er, 2–6, 6–1, 6–4
It was Alona and Kateryna's 1st career Grand Slam doubles title.

Mixed doubles

 Sun Tiantian /  Nenad Zimonjić defeated  Sania Mirza /  Mahesh Bhupathi, 7–6(7–4), 6–4
It was Sun's 1st career Grand Slam mixed doubles title.
It was Zimonjić's 3rd career Grand Slam mixed doubles title and his 2nd at the Australian Open.

Juniors

Boys' singles

 Bernard Tomic def  Yang Tsung-hua, 4–6, 7–6(5), 6–0

Girls' singles

 Arantxa Rus defeated  Jessica Moore, 6–3, 6–4

Boys' doubles

 Hsieh Cheng-peng /  Yang Tsung-hua defeated  Vasek Pospisil /  César Ramírez, 3–6, 7–5, [10]–[5]

Girls' doubles

 Ksenia Lykina /  Anastasia Pavlyuchenkova defeated  Elena Bogdan /  Misaki Doi, 6–0, 6–4

Wheelchair

Wheelchair men's singles

 Shingo Kunieda defeated  Michaël Jérémiasz, 6–1, 6–4

Wheelchair women's singles

 Esther Vergeer defeated  Korie Homan, 6–3, 6–3

Wheelchair men's doubles

 Shingo Kunieda /  Satoshi Saida defeated
 Robin Ammerlaan /  Ronald Vink, 6–4, 6–3

Wheelchair women's doubles

 Jiske Griffioen /  Esther Vergeer defeated  Korie Homan /  Sharon Walraven, 6–3, 6–1

Wheelchair quad singles

 Peter Norfolk defeated  David Wagner, 6–2, 6–3

Wheelchair quad doubles

 Nicholas Taylor /  David Wagner defeated  Sarah Hunter /  Peter Norfolk, 5–7, 6–0, [10]–[3]

Seeds
These were the seeds for the 2008 Australian Open.

On the women's side of the draw, all of the world's top thirty-two players were present; whereas in the men's draw Tommy Haas and Guillermo Cañas were both forced to withdraw due to injury. On the date that the seeds were announced, 11 January 2008, Haas was No. 12 in the world and Cañas No. 17.

Men's singles
  Roger Federer, (semifinals, lost to Novak Djokovic)
  Rafael Nadal, (semifinals, lost to Jo-Wilfried Tsonga)
  Novak Djokovic, (champion)
  Nikolay Davydenko, (4th Round, lost to Mikhail Youzhny)
  David Ferrer, (quarterfinals, lost to Novak Djokovic)
  Andy Roddick, (3rd Round, lost to Philipp Kohlschreiber)
  Fernando González, (3rd Round, lost to Marin Čilić)
  Richard Gasquet, (4th Round, lost to Jo-Wilfried Tsonga)
  Andy Murray, (1st Round, lost to Jo-Wilfried Tsonga)
  David Nalbandian, (3rd Round, lost to Juan Carlos Ferrero)
  Tommy Robredo, (2nd Round, lost to Mardy Fish)
  James Blake, (quarterfinals, lost to Roger Federer)
  Tomáš Berdych, (4th Round, lost to Roger Federer)
  Mikhail Youzhny, (quarterfinals, lost to Jo-Wilfried Tsonga)
  Marcos Baghdatis, (3rd Round, lost to Lleyton Hewitt)
  Carlos Moyá, (1st Round, lost to Stefan Koubek)
  Ivan Ljubičić, (1st Round, lost to Robin Haase)
  Juan Ignacio Chela, (1st Round, lost to Guillermo García López)
  Lleyton Hewitt, (4th Round, lost to Novak Djokovic)
  Ivo Karlović, (3rd Round, lost to Mikhail Youzhny)
  Juan Mónaco, (3rd Round, lost to Tomáš Berdych)
  Juan Carlos Ferrero, (4th Round, lost to David Ferrer)
  Paul-Henri Mathieu, (4th Round, lost to Rafael Nadal)
  Jarkko Nieminen, (quarterfinals, lost to Rafael Nadal)
  Fernando Verdasco, (2nd Round, lost to Janko Tipsarević)
  Stanislas Wawrinka, (2nd Round, lost to Marc Gicquel)
  Nicolás Almagro, (1st Round, lost to Marin Čilić)
  Gilles Simon, (3rd Round, lost to Rafael Nadal)
  Philipp Kohlschreiber, (4th Round, lost to Jarkko Nieminen)
  Radek Štěpánek, (1st Round, lost to Vincent Spadea)
  Igor Andreev, (3rd Round, lost to Richard Gasquet)
  Dmitry Tursunov, (2nd Round, lost to Sam Querrey)

Women's singles
  Justine Henin, (quarterfinals, lost to Maria Sharapova)
  Svetlana Kuznetsova, (3rd Round, lost to Agnieszka Radwańska)
  Jelena Janković, (semifinals, lost to Maria Sharapova)
  Ana Ivanovic, (final, lost to Maria Sharapova)
  Maria Sharapova, (champion)
  Anna Chakvetadze, (3rd Round, lost to Maria Kirilenko)
  Serena Williams, (quarterfinals, lost to Jelena Janković) 
  Venus Williams, (quarterfinals, lost to Ana Ivanovic)
  Daniela Hantuchová, (semifinals, lost to Ana Ivanovic)
  Marion Bartoli, (1st Round, lost to Sofia Arvidsson)
  Elena Dementieva, (4th Round, lost to Maria Sharapova)
  Nicole Vaidišová, (4th Round, lost to Serena Williams)
  Tatiana Golovin, (2nd Round, lost to Aravane Rezaï)
  Nadia Petrova, (4th Round, lost to Agnieszka Radwańska)
  Patty Schnyder, (2nd Round, lost to Casey Dellacqua)
  Dinara Safina, (1st Round, lost to Sabine Lisicki)
  Shahar Pe'er, (3rd Round, lost to Elena Dementieva)
  Amélie Mauresmo, (3rd Round, lost to Casey Dellacqua)
  Sybille Bammer, (2nd Round, lost to Hsieh Su-wei)
  Ágnes Szávay, (1st Round, lost to Ekaterina Makarova)
  Alona Bondarenko, (2nd Round, lost to Caroline Wozniacki)
  Lucie Šafářová, (1st Round, lost to Catalina Castaño)
  Vera Zvonareva, (1st Round, retired due to injury)
  Li Na, (3rd Round, lost to Marta Domachowska)
  Francesca Schiavone, (3rd Round, lost to Justine Henin)
  Victoria Azarenka, (3rd Round, lost to Serena Williams)
  Maria Kirilenko, (4th Round, lost to Daniela Hantuchová)
  Katarina Srebotnik, (3rd Round, lost to Ana Ivanovic)
  Agnieszka Radwańska, (quarterfinals, lost to Daniela Hantuchová)
  Virginie Razzano, (3rd Round, lost to Jelena Janković)
  Sania Mirza, (3rd Round, lost to Venus Williams)
  Julia Vakulenko, (1st Round, lost to Elena Vesnina)

Main draw wildcard entries

Men's singles
  Denis Istomin
  Alun Jones
  Brydan Klein
  Jesse Levine
  Nick Lindahl
  Mathieu Montcourt
  Joseph Sirianni
  Robert Smeets

Women's singles
  Monique Adamczak
  Madison Brengle
  Sophie Ferguson
  Jarmila Gajdošová
  Mathilde Johansson
  Jessica Moore
  Iroda Tulyaganova
  Christina Wheeler

Men's doubles
  Carsten Ball /  Adam Feeney
  Andrew Coelho /  Brydan Klein
  Colin Ebelthite /  Nick Lindahl
  Samuel Groth /  Joseph Sirianni
  Chris Guccione /  Peter Luczak
  Nathan Healey /  Robert Smeets
  Alun Jones /  Greg Jones

Women's doubles
  Monique Adamczak /  Christina Wheeler
  Alison Bai /  Nicole Kriz
  Tyra Calderwood /  Alenka Hubacek
  Casey Dellacqua /  Jessica Moore
  Daniella Dominikovic /  Emily Hewson
  Sophie Ferguson /  Trudi Musgrave
  Marija Mirkovic /  Karolina Wlodarczak

Mixed doubles
  Monique Adamczak /  Stephen Huss
  Sophie Ferguson /  Adam Feeney
  Jarmila Gajdošová /  Samuel Groth
  Isabella Holland /  Brydan Klein
  Alicia Molik /  Nathan Healey
  Jessica Moore /  Greg Jones

Qualifier entries

Men's qualifiers entries

  Robin Haase
  Lukáš Dlouhý
  Roko Karanušić
  Kevin Anderson
  Amer Delić
  Sam Warburg
  Denis Gremelmayr
  Lukáš Lacko
  Jamie Baker
  Harel Levy
  Wayne Odesnik
  Martin Slanar
  Viktor Troicki
  Marcel Granollers
  Rajeev Ram
  Konstantinos Economidis

Women's qualifiers entries

  Monica Niculescu
  Angelika Bachmann
  Ekaterina Ivanova
  Julia Schruff
  Alisa Kleybanova
  Tamarine Tanasugarn
  Hsieh Su-wei
  Marta Domachowska
  Timea Bacsinszky
  Sandra Klösel
  Yuan Meng
  Sabine Lisicki

Withdrawals 

Men's Singles
  Mario Ančić → replaced by  Bobby Reynolds
  Jonas Björkman → replaced by  Olivier Patience
  Guillermo Cañas → replaced by  Mariano Zabaleta
  Tommy Haas → replaced by  Lu Yen-hsun
  Gaël Monfils → replaced by  Juan Pablo Brzezicki
  Robin Söderling → replaced by  John Isner
  Potito Starace → replaced by  Robert Kendrick

Women's Singles
  Vera Dushevina → replaced by  Sorana Cîrstea
  Elena Likhovtseva → replaced by  Catalina Castaño
  Mara Santangelo → replaced by  Ekaterina Makarova
  Milagros Sequera → replaced by  Clarisa Fernández
  Meghann Shaughnessy → replaced by  Stéphanie Cohen-Aloro
  Samantha Stosur → replaced by  Vania King

References

External links

 Australian Open official website

 
 

 
2008 in Australian tennis
2008,Australian Open
January 2008 sports events in Australia